
Year 395 (CCCXCV) was a common year starting on Monday (link will display the full calendar) of the Julian calendar. At the time, it was known as the Year of the Consulship of Olybrius and Probinus (or, less frequently, year 1148 Ab urbe condita). The denomination 395 for this year has been used since the early medieval period, when the Anno Domini calendar era became the prevalent method in Europe for naming years.

Events 
 By place 

 Roman Empire 
 January 17 – Emperor Theodosius I, age 48, dies of a disease involving severe edema in Milan. The Roman Empire is again divided into an eastern and a western half. The Eastern Roman Empire is centered in Constantinople under Arcadius, son of Theodosius, and the Western Roman Empire in Mediolanum under his brother Honorius.
 April 27 – Arcadius marries Aelia Eudoxia, daughter of the Frankish general Flavius Bauto (without the knowledge or consent of Rufinus, Praetorian prefect of the East). His seven-year-old half-sister, Galla Placidia, is sent to Rome, where she spends her childhood in the household of Stilicho and his wife Serena.
 Alaric, Visigothic leader of the foederati, renounces Roman fealty and is declared king, waging war against both parts of the Roman Empire, and ending a 16-year period of peace.
 The Goths, led by Alaric I, invade and devastate Thrace and Macedonia and impose a tribute on Athens. 
 November 27 – Rufinus, Praetorian prefect of the East, is murdered by Gothic mercenaries under Gainas.

 Asia 
 December 8 – Later Yan is defeated by its former vassal Northern Wei at the Battle of Canhe Slope, during the Southern and Northern Dynasties period of China.
 The Huns begin their large-scale attack on the Eastern Roman Empire. They invade Armenia, Cappadocia, and enter parts of Syria, threatening Antioch.

 India 
 King Rudrasimha III, ruler of the Western Satraps (India), is defeated by the Gupta Empire.

 By topic 

 Agriculture 
 An estimated 330,000 acres of farmland lie abandoned in Campania (southern Italy), partly as a consequence of malaria from mosquitoes bred in swampy areas, but mostly because imprudent agriculture has ruined the land.

 Art and Science 
 Possible date that Ambrosius Theodosius Macrobius published his Saturnalia.

 Religion 
 Augustine, age 40, becomes bishop of Hippo Regius (modern Algeria). His assignment is the reunification of the Roman Catholic Church in Africa, primarily focusing on the Donatist movement led by Primianus of Carthage.
 Russian astronomer Nikolai Alexandrovich Morozov claimed that Revelation to John could be astronomically dated to September 30, 395.

Births

Deaths 
 January 17 – Theodosius I, Roman emperor (b. 347)
 November 27 – Rufinus, Roman consul and politician
 Apa Bane, Christian hermit and saint 
 Ausonius, Roman poet and rhetorician
 Gelasius of Caesarea, Christian bishop
 Macarius of Alexandria, Christian monk

References